Vasiuliškė is a village in Švenčionys District Municipality, in Vilnius County, in southeast Lithuania. As of the 2011 Lithuanian census, it had one resident. It is the birthplace of Kazimira Prunskienė, Lithuania's first Prime Minister since its return to independence in 1990.

See also
Švenčionys

References 

Villages in Vilnius County
Vilna Governorate
Wilno Voivodeship (1926–1939)